The Alarmist, also known as Life During Wartime, is a 1997 dark comedy film written and directed by Evan Dunsky and starring David Arquette, Stanley Tucci, Kate Capshaw, and Ryan Reynolds. The film is an adaptation of a 1990 play written by Keith Reddin.

Cast
 David Arquette as Tommy Hudler
 Stanley Tucci as Heinrich Grigoris
 Kate Capshaw as Gale Ancona
 Mary McCormack as Sally
 Ryan Reynolds as Howard Ancona
 Tricia Vessey as April Brody
 Ruth Miller as Mrs. Fielding
 Hoke Howell as Mr. Fielding
 Michael Learned as Beth Hudler
 Lewis Arquette as Bruce Hudler
 Richmond Arquette as Andrew Hudler
 Gabriel Dell Jr. as Skippy Hudler
 Clea DuVall as Suzy (as Clea Duvall)
 David Brisbin as Detective Flinkman
 Matt Malloy as Morgue Technician
 Alex Nepomniaschy as Installer

Reception
The Alarmist was reviewed by several mainstream critics. Most of them praised Stanley Tucci's performance, but criticized the film itself.

Stephen Holden from The New York Times called Tucci's performance "one of the subtlest, most delicious performances of his career". He found the first part of the film very entertaining, but considered that the movie deteriorates in its second part when it becomes more serious. "Shortly after the halfway point, "The Alarmist" takes a dramatic U-turn into a murder mystery in which Tommy suspects his boss of being the killer. At this point a movie that succeeded as a light, loopy satire of sex, salesmanship, shoddy ethics, gun nuts and geeky teen-agers finds itself seriously in over its head. Unable to decide where to go or what tone to adopt, it ends up treading water."

Edward Guthmann from San Francisco Chronicle also praised Tucci's performance, but criticized the film indecision. "As a showcase for Tucci's comic skills, "The Alarmist" succeeds. We start the film feeling buoyed by his roosterlike energy and audacity, and we end it feeling let down by a script that can't quite decide what it wants to say." Steve Davis from The Austin Chronicle called The Alarmist a "near-pointless movie" and wrote: "Perhaps the greatest sin of The Alarmist is its complete waste of Tucci in the role of Heinreich Grigoris, Hudler's paternal but unscrupulous mentor. Tucci never takes off; it's a stillborn performance. Maybe if Tucci had found something with which to work, the movie in turn might have found the center it so badly needs. As it is, The Alarmist is a movie that doesn't ring any bells."

References

External links

 
 

1997 films
1997 comedy films
1990s English-language films
American films based on plays
Films scored by Christophe Beck
American comedy films
1990s American films